Andile Lili is a South African who has served as a Member of the Western Cape Provincial Parliament since May 2019, representing the African National Congress. He is the party's spokesperson on human settlements. He was previously a City of Cape Town councillor.

In 2013, Lili was dismissed as a councillor after he led protesters to throw human excrement on the steps of the provincial government building and at the Cape Town International Airport. He then formed the Ses'khona People's Rights Movement. He was elected to the  ANC's provincial executive in 2015. Lili returned to council after the 2016 elections.

References

External links

Living people
Year of birth missing (living people)
Xhosa people
People from Cape Town
Members of the Western Cape Provincial Parliament
African National Congress politicians